Alasdair George Garnsworthy (born 30 December 1983) is a former English cricketer. Garnsworthy was a right-handed batsman who played primarily as a wicketkeeper.

Garnsworthy made a single List-A appearance for the Somerset Cricket Board against Cornwall in the 1st round of the 2003 Cheltenham & Gloucester Trophy which was played in 2002.  In the match he scored a single run before being dismissed by Justin Stephens and behind the stumps he took 2 catches.

References

External links
Alasdair Garnsworthy at Cricinfo
Alasdair Garnsworthy at CricketArchive

1983 births
People from Marlborough, Wiltshire
English cricketers
Somerset Cricket Board cricketers
Living people
Wicket-keepers